Jaesong station is a railway station of the Donghae Line in Jaesong-dong, Haeundae District, Busan, South Korea.

Station layout

References

Haeundae District
Korail stations
Railway stations in Busan
Railway stations opened in 1989
1989 establishments in South Korea
20th-century architecture in South Korea